Kenneth Charles Baston (born 29 June 1949) is an Australian politician who is a former Liberal Party member of the Western Australian Legislative Council representing the Mining and Pastoral Region. First elected to parliament at the 2005 state election, Baston was elevated to Cabinet following the 2013 state election, and held the positions of Minister for Agriculture and Food and Minister for Fisheries until March 2016.

Baston described his childhoodgrowing up on a sheep station that was run by his parents on the coast north west of Carnarvon, Western Australiaas idyllic. He completed his early education by correspondence before heading to boarding school in Perth to complete his education.

Baston won preselection for the region for the 2008 election and was chosen to be listed second on the ballot paper for the Liberal Party, after Norman Moore.

References

1949 births
Living people
Members of the Western Australian Legislative Council
Liberal Party of Australia members of the Parliament of Western Australia
People from the Gascoyne
People educated at Christ Church Grammar School
21st-century Australian politicians